Cheshmehha may refer to:

Cheshmehha, Rudbar-e Jonubi, Kerman Province
Cheshmehha, Tehran